Sir William Brandford Griffith,  (11 August 1824 – 1897) was a British administrative official, Governor of the Gold Coast from 1880 to 1881 and again from 1885 to 1895.

Brandford Griffith was lieutenant-governor in the Gold Coast, and acting governor from 1 December 1880 until 4 March 1881, when Sir Samuel Rowe was appointed governor. On Governor Young's death, he became Governor of the colony for a decade, from 24 April 1885 until retirement on 7 April 1895.

Griffith was born and died in Barbados. He is buried at St. Michael's Cathedral, Bridgetown.

His son, Sir William Brandford Griffith, was Chief Justice of the Gold Coast from 1895 to 1911.

External links
Portrait of Sir W. Brandford Griffith at New York Public Library

References

1824 births
1897 deaths
British civil servants
Knights Commander of the Order of St Michael and St George
Ghanaian police officers